Deniker is a surname. Notable people with the surname include:

Joseph Deniker (1852–1918), French-Russian naturalist and anthropologist
Pierre Deniker (1917–1998), French psychiatrist

See also
Denike